Dominique Daguet (22 September 1938 – November 1, 2021) was a French writer, poet and journalist. He was the creator and animator of the literary magazine  published in Troyes (from 1975).

He won the prix Fénéon in 1960 for his book Soleil et Lune. From 1960 onwards, he published some fifty books and developed a strong interest in the Shroud of Turin.

External links 
 Dominique Daguet and Les Cahiers bleus 
 Dominique Daguet on Le Parvis des Alliances
 Théâtre : Laure et Christophe on Dominique Daguet's blog
 Le Linceul de Turin by Dominique Daguer on YouTube

20th-century French poets
21st-century French poets
20th-century French journalists
21st-century French journalists
Prix Fénéon winners
1938 births
Living people